State Highway 19 runs in Tirupur District of Tamil Nadu, India. It connects Avinashi(Coimbatore) with Kochi Road. It will provide an additional connectivity with the Eastern suburban places of Coimbatore like Avinashi, Palladam, Tirupur with Kochi.

Route 
Avinashi(Coimbatore), Tirupur, Palladam(Coimbatore), Pollachi(Coimbatore), Kochi Road.

Major junctions

National Highways 
 National Highway NH-47 at Avinashi(Tirupur suburban)
 National Highway NH-67 at Palladam(Coimbatore suburban)

State Highways 
 State Highway 174 (Tamil Nadu)
 State Highway 169 (Tamil Nadu)

References

State highways in Tamil Nadu